Tanchangya or Tongchangya may refer to:
Tanchangya people
Tanchangya language
Tanchangya alphabet

Language and nationality disambiguation pages